Ricardo Lísias (born July 7, 1975) is a Brazilian writer.

Born in São Paulo, he debuted in literature in 1999 with the novel Cobertor de estrelas, which he wrote while still studying Literature at the University of Campinas. He was a finalist for the 2008 Jabuti Prize with Anna O. e outras novelas  (which included a reprint of the short stories Capuz and Dos nervos, previously published in short print) and the 2010 São Paulo Literature Award for O livro dos mandarins. His story Tólia was selected for the English magazine Granta The Best Young Brazilian Writers edition, in 2012.

Works 

 1999 - Cobertor de estrelas 
 2001 - Capuz 
 2004 - Dos nervos 
 2005 - Duas praças 
 2007 - Anna O. e outras novelas 
 2009 - O livro dos mandarins 
 2012 - O céu dos suicidas 
 2013 - Divórcio 
 2015 - Concentração e outros contos 
 2016 - Inquérito policial: família Tobias 
 2016 - A vista particular 
 2017 - Diário Da Cadeia  
 2018 - Diário da catástrofe brasileira: I - transição

Children's books 

 2001 - Sai da Frente, Vaca Brava
 2005 - Greve Contra a Guerra 
 2014 - A Sacola Perdida

References

External links 
 ROSA, Victor da. Ricardo Lísias – Artes plásticas e Fisiologia da solidão (plaquete).

Writers from São Paulo
1975 births
Living people